Zolota Lypa is a river in Western Ukraine. It flows through the Ternopil and Chortkiv Raions, forming the Berezhany Lake north of the city of Berezhany. It is a left tributary of Dniester, belonging to the Black Sea basin.The name means "golden linden tree" and has the same meaning in all  Slavic languages.
The river with the opposite meaning Hnyla Lypa ("rotten linden tree) flows parallel 30 km west from Berezhany.

External links
 Zolota Lypa River in the Internet Encyclopedia of Ukraine, vol. 5 (1993)

Rivers of Lviv Oblast
Rivers of Ternopil Oblast